The 2002 NAPA 500 was the 33rd stock car race of the 2002 NASCAR Winston Cup Series and the 43rd iteration of the event. The race was held on Sunday, October 27, 2002, before a crowd of 110,000 in Hampton, Georgia at Atlanta Motor Speedway, a  permanent asphalt quad-oval intermediate speedway. The race was shortened from its scheduled 325 laps to 248 due to incumbent weather during the race. At race's end, Kurt Busch, driving for Roush Racing, would lead the race when the race was put under caution on lap 242, with the race eventually being called six laps later. The win was Busch's third career NASCAR Winston Cup Series win and his third of the season. To fill out the podium, Joe Nemechek of Hendrick Motorsports and Dale Jarrett of Robert Yates Racing would finish second and third, respectively.

Background 

Atlanta Motor Speedway (formerly Atlanta International Raceway) is a track in Hampton, Georgia, 20 miles (32 km) south of Atlanta. It is a 1.54-mile (2.48 km) quad-oval track with a seating capacity of 111,000. It opened in 1960 as a 1.5-mile (2.4 km) standard oval. In 1994, 46 condominiums were built over the northeastern side of the track. In 1997, to standardize the track with Speedway Motorsports' other two 1.5-mile (2.4 km) ovals, the entire track was almost completely rebuilt. The frontstretch and backstretch were swapped, and the configuration of the track was changed from oval to quad-oval. The project made the track one of the fastest on the NASCAR circuit.

Entry list 

 (R) denotes rookie driver.

Practice

First practice 
The first practice session was held on Friday, October 25, at 3:20 PM EST, and would last for 2 hours.

Second practice 
The second practice session was held on Saturday, October 26, at 9:30 AM EST, and would last for 45 minutes.

Third and final practice 
The third and final practice session, sometimes referred to as Happy Hour, was held on Saturday, October 26, at 11:15 AM EST, and would last for 45 minutes.

Qualifying 
Qualifying was scheduled to be held on Friday, October 25, at 7:05 PM EST. However, rain would force the cancellation of qualifying. As a result, the starting lineup would be based on the current 2002 owner's points. Due to this, Joe Gibbs Racing driver Tony Stewart would win the pole.

Eight drivers would fail to qualify: Geoff Bodine, Frank Kimmel, Scott Wimmer, Greg Biffle, Buckshot Jones, Jack Sprague, Kerry Earnhardt, and Ron Hornaday Jr.

Full qualifying results

Race results

References 

2002 NASCAR Winston Cup Series
NASCAR races at Atlanta Motor Speedway
October 2002 sports events in the United States
2002 in sports in Georgia (U.S. state)